HBHS refers to several high schools:

Australia
Homebush Boys High School, in Homebush, Sydney

Kiribati
Hiram Bingham High School, in Rongorongo, Beru Island

New Zealand
Hamilton Boys' High School, in Hamilton
Hastings Boys' High School, in Hastings

United Kingdom
Haydon Bridge High School, in Haydon Bridge, Northumberland, England

United States
Helen Bernstein High School, in Los Angeles, California
High Bridge High School, in High Bridge, New Jersey
Hollis/Brookline High School, in Hollis, New Hampshire
Hudson's Bay High School, in Vancouver, Washington
Huntington Beach High School, in Huntington Beach, California